The ninth series of Ex on the Beach, a British television programme began on 15 August 2018, The series was confirmed at the end of the eighth series final episode in May 2018. The cast members for this series were confirmed on 23 July 2018, and features former Made in Chelsea cast member Daisy Robins, as well as The Valleys star Natalee Harris. The series was filmed in Tulum, Mexico at the luxury villa Playaakun. This series it was revealed that the exes would have more power than ever before, as the "Tablet of Terror" continued to throw twists at them.

Cast
The official list of cast members were released on 23 July 2018. They include four boys; Aaron Gill, Bobby Ballard, Josiah Miller, and Zayn London, and four girls; Alicia Bradon, Daisy Robins, Natalee Harris, and Rhianne Saxby. Daisy has previously appeared as a cast member on Made in Chelsea, whilst Natalee featured in another MTV series The Valleys. Aaron also appeared on Spring Break with Grandad. Jack Devlin, an ex from the sixth series was also confirmed to be making his return to the show, this time as another ex.

All original cast members arrived at the beach during the first episode and were immediately told to prepare for the arrival of their exes. Bayley Jenkins was the first ex to turn up on the beach, as the ex-girlfriend of Bobby. The second episode featured the arrival of Zayn's ex-girlfriend Dominika Wrobel, who turned up desperate for revenge. The episode also included Nicky Hardy's first appearance, as he made a surprise entrance despite not having an ex in the villa. However she wasn't far behind as his ex-girlfriend Scarlett Harrison later arrived to cause carnage for him. The Tablet of Terror also gave Rhianne the power to send somebody home in this episode, who ultimately chose Zayn. George Keys made his debut during the third episode, as the ex-fling of Bayley. The fourth episode included Matty B arriving at the beach as Daisy's ex-girlfriend, and he's given the power to send one former couple home, where he chooses Nicky and Scarlett. During the fifth episode Angelica Fomia arrives at the beach as the former girlfriend of Josiah, and Katie Mann arrives during the sixth episode as a blast from the past for George. Daisy's second ex-boyfriend Sam Ellerington made his debut during the seventh episode, and star of the sixth series Jack Devlin turned up during the eighth as Katie's ex-boyfriend. Josiah was also sent home during this episode after Katie was given the ultimate extra power from the Tablet of Terror. Episode nine featured the arrival of Aaron's ex-girlfriend Dominika Olejnik as well as the departures of both Angelica and Sam following a further twist. Alex Harbrow arrived during the tenth episode hoping to rekindle a relationship with former flame Alicia, and Rob Tommarello caused maximum destruction for ex-girlfriend Bayley during his arrival in the eleventh episode. The final ex of the series was Beth Sedgley, who joined her ex-boyfriend Matty B in the villa.

Bold indicates original cast member; all other cast were brought into the series as an ex.

Duration of cast

Table Key
 Key:  = "Cast member" is featured in this episode
 Key:  = "Cast member" arrives on the beach
 Key:  = "Cast member" has an ex arrive on the beach
 Key:  = "Cast member" has two exes arrive on the beach
 Key:  = "Cast member" arrives on the beach and has an ex arrive during the same episode
 Key:  = "Cast member" leaves the beach
 Key:  = "Cast member" has an ex arrive on the beach and leaves during the same episode
 Key:  = "Cast member" arrives on the beach and leaves during the same episode
 Key:  = "Cast member" does not feature in this episode

Episodes

{| class="wikitable plainrowheaders" style="width:100%"
|- style="color:black"
! style="background:#F3F781;"| No. inseries
! style="background:#F3F781;"| No. inseason
! style="background:#F3F781;"| Title
! style="background:#F3F781;"| Original air date
! style="background:#F3F781;"| Duration
! style="background:#F3F781;"| UK viewers

|}

Ratings

References

External links
Official website 
www.Playaakun.com.mx 

2018 British television seasons
09